Louhi is a queen in Finnish mythology and the mythology of Lapland.

Louhi may also refer to

 Finnish minelayer Louhi, built in 1916
 Finnish pollution control vessel Louhi, built in 2011
 Loukhi (Finnish and Karelian: Louhi), an urban locality in the Loukhsky District, Republic of Karelia, Russia
 Louhi, a fictional character in the video game Final Fantasy: The 4 Heroes of Light
 3897 Louhi, a minor planet

People with the surname 
 Juha Louhi, formerly Juha Turunen (born 1964), Finnish lawyer, politician and kidnapper
 Jyrki Louhi, Finnish professional ice hockey forward